Sebastián Manuel Corona Nacarino (born 8 July 1976) is a Spanish retired footballer who played as a central defender, and the assistant manager of Sevilla Atlético.

Club career
Born in Lora del Río, Province of Seville, Corona played first as a professional for hometown club Sevilla FC, but only appeared in 20 games in almost four years with the first team, and just three in La Liga. Subsequently, from January 2000 to June 2006, he would be a defensive mainstay in the second division, with Albacete Balompié, CD Tenerife and Real Murcia.

In 2007, Corona signed with SD Huesca of the third level, being an essential member as the Aragonese side promoted in his first year, a first-ever for them, and continuing to be a starter in the following seasons (never less than 28 league appearances). Over the course of 13 campaigns in that tier, he played 358 matches and scored 12 goals.

The 36-year-old Corona returned to division three in the summer of 2012, joining CD Leganés.

References

External links

1976 births
Living people
People from Vega del Guadalquivir
Sportspeople from the Province of Seville
Spanish footballers
Footballers from Andalusia
Association football defenders
La Liga players
Segunda División players
Segunda División B players
Sevilla Atlético players
Sevilla FC players
Granada CF footballers
Albacete Balompié players
CD Tenerife players
Real Murcia players
Águilas CF players
SD Huesca footballers
CD Leganés players